The Speedwell Motor Car Company was a Brass Era American automobile manufacturing company established by Pierce Davies Schenck that produced cars from 1907 to 1914.  The Great Dayton Flood of 1913 greatly damaged the Speedwell factory and inventory, and the company entered receivership in 1915 after having built an estimated 4,000 cars and trucks.

History
Pierce D. Schenck of Dayton established the Speedwell Motor Car Company with a $50,000 capitalization.  He hired Gilbert J. Loomis, who had built Loomis cars in Massachusetts, as Chief engineer.

The first Speedwells had Rutenber four and six-cylinder engines on wheelbases of 116 and 132 inches. After the Panic of 1907, the decision was made to build cars on one chassis of 120 inches with a four-cylinder engine built by Speedwell. By 1909 model year production quadrupled from the 25 cars produced in 1907.

Schenck expanded his factory until there were nine buildings.  The company rented factory space to the Wright Company to build its airplanes from February to November 1910, while the Wright Company built its own factory building in west Dayton.

From 1909, the Speedwell's base price was $2,500, . Advertising stated "It would be folly to pay more," and “It would be unwise to pay less." The Speedwell was a well built car with a dedication to detail. Speedwell was among the earliest companies to market a torpedo and the only one to use concealed door hinges and place the horn under the hood. Although a one-chassis policy, it did not limit Speedwells being offered in several body styles, including some evocatively called Cruiser, Duck Boat and Speed Car.  

From 1910, Speedwell was manufacturing light and heavy duty delivery trucks as well.  Most of the 4,000 Speedwells built during the lifetime of the company were sold from 1909 to mid-1912.  In 1911, Speedwell built a closed two-door, dubbed a sedan, which was the first recorded use of the term.  Pierce Schenck turned his interest to malleable iron, and soon after, Gilbert Loomis left Dayton.   

Cyrus E. Mead designed a rotary-valve engine and supporters bought into Speedwell Motor Car Company to get it into production. The Mead people pushed through a rotary-valve car, while the Speedwell people insisted that a standard poppet-valve car be offered as well, resulting in both types being offered.  In 1913, Cyrus Mead was killed in an automobile accident, which meant that any refinements needed to the engine would no receive the expertise of its inventor.

In March 1913, the Great Dayton Flood put the Speedwell plant out of action for several months.  The dealer agencies for Speedwell was initially very strong, but dealers left in large numbers when their deliveries slowed down.  The rotary-valve six-cylinder model was also not selling well.  Bankruptcy was declared early in 1915.

The Speedwell factory was leased to the Recording and Computing Machines Company and was later sold to the W. M. Pattison Supply Company.  The repair parts and business of Speedwell was acquired by the Puritan Machine Company, headed by A. O. Dunk who made a practice of buying failed automobile companies.  The factory site later hosted a Delco factory.  The Speedwell factory buildings are not extant.  About 12 Speedwells are known to be extant.

See also
 Apple, an early Dayton automobile manufacturer
Dayton Electric, an early Dayton automobile manufacturer
Stoddard-Dayton an early Dayton automobile manufacturer

References

Additional reading
Curt Dalton, Roger L. Miller, Michael M. Self, and Ben F. Thompson, Miami Valley's Marvelous Motor Cars: From the Apple-Eight to the Xenia Cyclecar, 1886-1960 (2007).

External links
Company history at RitzSite
Speedwell at ConceptCarz
NYPL Digital Collection - Speedwell Catalog

Defunct motor vehicle manufacturers of the United States
Motor vehicle manufacturers based in Ohio
Defunct companies based in Dayton, Ohio
Vehicle manufacturing companies established in 1907
Vehicle manufacturing companies disestablished in 1915
1900s cars
1910s cars
Brass Era vehicles
Cars introduced in 1907